John Fintan Daly (born 1957) is an Irish Gaelic football coach and former player. In a coaching career that has spanned over 40 years, he has enjoyed All-Ireland successes at club and inter-county levels. He  has three children, notably John Fintan Daly Jr. (known as 'Small John' and 'Big Small John').

Management career

Daly's playing career with Knocknagree ended prematurely when he suffered a cruciate ligament injury as a 20-year-old, however, he immediately became involved in team management and coaching with the club. Over the course of a 40-year association, he has guided the club to numerous junior divisional championship titles before managing the team to the All-Ireland Club Championship title in 2017. Daly had earlier managed the Milltown/Castlemaine club in Kerry to the All-Ireland Intermediate Championship at intermediate level in 2012. At inter-county level, he has been involved as a selector and coach with various Cork teams. He guided the Cork junior team to the All-Ireland Championship title in 1984, before managing the Cork under-21 team to All-Ireland success a decade later in 1994. Daly's back-to-back County Championship successes with Duhallow in 1990 and 1991 earned him a place as a selector with the Cork senior football team.

Honours

Player

Knocknagree
Duhallow Junior A Football Championship: 1978

Management

Milltown/Castlemaine
All-Ireland Intermediate Club Football Championship: 2012
Munster Intermediate Club Football Championship: 2012
Kerry Intermediate Football Championship: 2011

Knocknagree
Cork Premier Intermediate Football Championship: 2020
Cork Intermediate Football Championship: 2019
All-Ireland Junior Club Football Championship: 2018
Munster Junior Club Football Championship: 2017
Cork Junior A Football Championship: 1984, 2017

Duhallow
Cork Senior Football Championship: 1990, 1991

Cork
All-Ireland Junior Football Championship: 1984
Munster Junior Football Championship: 1984
All-Ireland Under-21 Football Championship: 1994
Munster Under-21 Football Championship: 1994

References

1957 births
Living people
Knocknagree Gaelic footballers
Gaelic football managers
Gaelic football selectors